The Alliance High School (or AHS) popularly known as "Bush", is a public national high school for boys located in Kikuyu, Kenya.

Established on 1 March 1926 by the Alliance of Protestant Churches - The Church of Scotland Mission (later known as the Presbyterian Church of East Africa or PCEA), Church of the Province of Kenya (CPK) (later known as the Anglican Church of Kenya), African Inland Church (AIC), the Friends Church (Quakers) and the Methodist Church, the school was one of the first schools in Kenya to offer secondary school education to Africans. The school is a 10-minute walk from the Alliance Girls' High School, its sister school.

Alliance High School has always been ranked within the top ten best schools in each year's National Examinations. It was ranked first in the country from 1960 to 1985. In 1986 it lost its top ranking for the first time in 25 years, slipping to third. It was ranked first in the country in 2005 based on the results of the Kenya Certificate of Secondary Education (KCSE). In 2006, it was ranked third. In 2009 and 2010, the school emerged top in the KCSE results posting sterling performance. In 2011, the school dropped one place to second. In 2013 the school was on top again with a mean grade of A− beating other famous schools like Starehe Boys' Centre and School

The school motto is "Strong to Serve". The Old Boys Association has a website and a Yahoo group known as Bushfire.

History

Founding 
In the early days of the colonial era in Kenya, the colonialists believed that Africans should not be allowed an education beyond the basic level as they would not benefit from any higher education. The rationale was that Africans were only useful as a source of cheap labour. Missionaries who had been arriving in the country from the beginning of the 20th century strongly opposed this idea. The missionaries had been trying to set up primary schools to provide basic education to Africans, but they faced challenges due to a lack of funding. Dr. John Arthur, who was in charge of the Kikuyu mission arranged for a conference with other Protestant missions to address these problems. The first meeting took place in 1913 in Kikuyu. Later in the year 1918, the Alliance of Protestant Missions was formed comprising the Church of Scotland Mission, the Church of the Province of Kenya, the African Inland Mission, the Friends Church (Quakers) and the Methodist Church.

Dr. Arthur pushed the British government to open education to Kenyans and all Africans in all colonies. He believed that Kenyans should be given access to primary, secondary and tertiary level education as a matter of right. His efforts bore fruit when the Devonshire White Paper was written in 1923. This meant that Africans were also entitled to quality education. Dr. Arthur realised the need to have new institutions set up. He worked tirelessly, without the government's backing to establish a high school for Africans in Kikuyu. The school was finally established on 1 March 1926 under the auspices of the Alliance of Protestant Missions. Thus, the Alliance High School was born.

Academics

Admission 
 Every year, over 400 students are chosen based on academic merit and quotas in accordance with the education policy. The performance in the K.C.P.E exams determines academic merit. Its quota system ensures that the school admits boys from every county in the country, with a preference for students from public schools, as required by current education policy.

Students are admitted on a need-blind basis. At any given time, there are needy students whose tuition and boarding fees are paid by parties other than their parents or guardians. This is thanks to the school's strong alumni network (the Old Boys Club) as well as the large number of friends the school has around the world.

Performance and ranking 

The school is the highest performing high school in the country academically, always being ranked among the top 10 positions every year. The school holds the country record for most consecutive years holding the pole position in the national exams(1960-1985) . In the K.C.S.E results announced in 2011, the school emerged top in the country. In that same year, the school had more than 100 students scoring a mean grade of A in the national exams. In 2009 and 2010, the school emerged top in the K.C.S.E results posting sterling performance. In 2011, the school was  ranked second.

Every year, over 98% of the school's graduates get admission to Kenyan universities. Some Alliance High alumni have proceeded to join various universities around the world including Australia, China, Japan, Malaysia, South Africa, the United Kingdom and United States.

Faith 

Having been founded by Christian missionaries, the school holds Christian values in high esteem. For instance, the school's badge is embodied with the cross, students say grace before partaking in any meal and there is a daily Chapel Service (except on Saturdays) which is compulsory for all Christian students.

However, being a national school that draws students from all over the country, Alliance High School has a small population of non-Christian students, mostly Muslims. These students have the liberty to practise their faith. When the Christian students attend the daily morning chapel service, Muslim students congregate separately to carry out a religious service of their own. Although there is no permanent mosque in the school, there is always a room set aside that serves as a mosque. Due to Islamic Sharia dietary requirements, Muslim students have separate tables in the dining hall.

The school has an anthem which is sung to mark the end of special occasions such as the Founders day, Speech Day or the closing parade of the term. The anthem can also be sung when there is an occasion to celebrate, such as when the K.C.S.E results are released. The anthem is a rendition of hymn 578 of the Lutheran Hymnal, Lord, While for All Mankind We Pray

Sports

The school is a participant in the national sports festival. The following games are offered at the school: athletics, badminton, basketball, baseball, football (soccer), handball, hockey, lawn tennis, rugby football, swimming and table tennis.

The school has three basketball courts, two football pitches, two hockey pitches, a swimming pool, a handball field, an athletics track and a gymnasium with table tennis table.

The school's routine includes a games period every weekday from 16:30 to 17:40. On Tuesdays the program is suspended for clubs' and societies' meetings. There are inter-house sports competitions spread across the three school terms.

During the second school term, a mini Olympics is held in the school. During this event, the thirteen houses compete against each other in track and field events. The winning house receives the Standards Trophy and gets to feast on a bull during the end of term school dinner.

There is also a compulsory cross-country jog on the first weekend of the school term. This event is popular yet unpopular among the students; many approach it with zeal while many A.H.S students approach the game's master with an excuse to avoid the jog.

Clubs and societies

There are over 20 clubs and societies including the Research Club, The World Scholars Cup, The Dramatic Society, the law and debate club, the MIT launch X, the social welfare society, the Scouts Movement, the International Information Exchange Program Club, the school choir, the Men-in-Brass(School Band), the Science and Robotics Club, the Integrity Club, the Writers’ Club, the Poetry Society, Kiswahili Club, the Model United Nations, the Seventh Day Adventists (SDA) Society, the Young Catholic Society (YCS), the Christian Union, Muslim Association among many others. These clubs usually meet on Tuesdays from 16:16 to 17:30, while the religious societies meet every evening.
The Alliance High School Scouts is one of the first troops of African scouts in the continent.

Exchange program

The school has several exchange programs but the longest running ones are the Brooks Exchange Program and the Sir John Leeman Exchange Program. There is also the Governor's Exchange Program.

Every year, two form 3 students of outstanding character both inside and outside the classroom are chosen to participate in the Brooks Exchange Program. The two students usually serve as hosts to two other students from Brooks School. Unlike the Brooks Exchange Program, the Sir John Leeman Exchange Program takes place once every 2 years. In addition, there are the Barack Obama Leadership Program and others to various countries such as France, Germany and South Africa. Students also participate in contests such as the International Mathematical Olympiad.

School Dormitories 

The school has thirteen dormitories, four of which were built in 2017, and accommodate almost 1,800 students. The houses are, in order of age, and with the reason for the name:

 Livingstone House: Scottish explorer Dr. David Livingstone
 Aggrey House: Dr Aggrey of Achimota
 Wilberforce House: Scottish abolitionist Sir William Wilberforce
 Grieve House: first principal of the school George Arthur Grieve
 Arthur House: Scottish medical missionary John Arthur
 Francis House: school's second principal Edward Carey Francis
 Smith House: longest serving member of the teaching staff James Stephen Smith
 Sellwood House: Major Sellwood.
 Campbell House: school's third principal, L. J. Campbell
 Sanders House: the school's fourth principal, A. C. E. Sanders
 Stansfield: the school's fifth principal, J. Githaiga
 Wangai House: the school's sixth principal, E. Wangai
 Paul Otula Complex: the school's seventh principal, S. S. Maneno
Many activities within the school are based on the house system. This includes the arrangement at the parade ground where assemblies are conducted every morning and role call parades are conducted. Inter house competitions include music and elocution, drama, math contest, Swahili contest, essay writing contest, battle of the blocks writing challenge, cleanliness competitions, and sports such as soccer, rugby, racquet games, swimming, etc.

At the end of every term, during the school dinner, awarding sessions are held where the winning house in every category receives a carton of biscuits. The First and second runners up receive half and quarter a carton respectively. The winning house in standards and athletics, K.C.S.E. and cross country is awarded a bull which is slaughtered and offered for a party.

The houses have a committee of form 3 students who run the house's day-to-day activities. The committee is usually chosen by the house prefects and the housemaster. It is composed mainly of the chairman, vice chairman, secretary, organizing secretary, activities coordinator and resource manager and two members of the house's choice. However, houses may have additional positions which vary depending on their need.  In most cases, these committee members end up as house prefects. However, this trend is changing to incorporate students with impeccable leadership qualities  who did not make it to the house committees into the prefecture body.

Students in these houses are housed in hostels. The hostels are structured into cubicles where four students share one cubicle. The hostels have washroom facilities with hot showers, laundry areas, ironing bays, a common room and open lawns. Due to the current high population old houses have been renovated to house the rapidly growing population.

Prefects

Prefects at the school are usually from 4 students who have shown outstanding leadership abilities at the house level. Most of them are chosen from the house committees. During the second term of the academic year, they are appointed to be prefects by the principal after being nominated and vetted by the housemasters and current house prefects. They are then put through a rigorous training session by their fourth form counterparts in preparation for running the school the following year.

The prefects are key to the running of the school. It is they who see that the school routine and school rules are adhered to. They have the authority to punish culprits via the prefect's punishment department. Punishments include washing corridors and rooms, slashing fields and in some extreme cases, working in the school farm or uprooting tree stumps.

A total of about 90 prefects are chosen each year and among the 90, 28 of the most outstanding prefects are given the top honour of becoming Senior Prefects or Captains. These Captains are allocated to various major departments in the school. The school's departments include: Dining Hall, Entertainment, Games, Compound, Library, Chapel, IT and Links, Medical, Protocol, Utilities, Sponsorship, and
Academic.

Each department has its department members which vary with the demands of the department. Each house similarly produces a House Captain to be assisted by his Dorm Prefects.

The top five captains are referred to as the Pentagon. They are the School Captain, the Deputy School Captain, the Dining Hall Captain, the Entertainment Captain, and the Games Captain. The prefects' body is given a name each year, e.g. Martinets (2014), Autocrats (2015), Acculturates (2016), Despotians (2017), Relictans (2018), Nomandians(2019), Luminaries(2020/21),Stalwarts (2021/22) and is governed by the School Captain (The Governor General) and the Deputy School Captain (The President).

Alliance Girls High School

The Alliance High School maintains strong ties with its sister school, Alliance Girls High School, ever since the latter was founded as the African Girls High School in 1948. Each of the thirteen houses at the Alliance High School has sister houses at Alliance Girls High School. The houses usually participate in an event called Socials that takes place at the end of the first and second terms. There is also a joint Christmas Carol service held in the school chapel towards the end of the third term. On Sunday mornings, Muslim students from the girls’ school usually congregate with their male counterparts at the Alliance High School's Carey Francis Memorial Lecture Theater. Mail correspondence between the two schools takes place on a daily basis and is free of charge.

Culture

The Alliance High School community is rich in culture. The form ones take the unpopular tie test before they can be issued with the school's blue tie. This test serves to educate the freshmen on the school's history and current affairs at the school. Upon arrival, every form 1 student is assigned a ‘guardian’ who is a form 2 student that helps the new student find his way around the school in the first few weeks.

The art of 'lifting' is a common practice ,especially among form two and three students. Lifting is the process of one showing their leadership qualities in various ways so as to be considered for various leadership positions ,especially as prefects.

Over the years, the school has opened and closed its term calendar on Thursdays. The first Saturday is often marked with a cross-country race. Closing days are characterized by a school dinner on the closing eve, where students are treated to a sumptuous meal and an award ceremony held. The school is then closed early the next morning through a final assembly where the students sing the dismissal hymn, "Lord dismiss us with thy blessing."

Thursday is a special day at the Alliance High School. On Thursdays, students conduct hymn practice in the chapel, students speak Swahili, fish is served during dinner, among other activities.

The most popular form of entertainment in the school is the Saturday movies. Every Saturday the entertainment committee which consists of form 2s and 3s and the entertainment department which has about 5 prefects organizes and prepares the Saturday movies. School movies held in the school hall were previously charged sh 20 but are now free to all and sundry. However, the most popular movies are the joint movies that are usually held termly with the Alliance Girls’ School. These used to be held at night but have since been changed to afternoons.

High school life is fun and exciting. Various platforms like the drama and music competitions provide students with a chance to showcase their talents. The Dramatic Society organizes the biggest Comic Show of the entire year called "Span One" where students simulate the Monday morning School Assembly and try to imitate their teachers. The School Choir also organizes the Music Night which features presentations not only from the choir but also dances from all the communities in the country.

Uniform

Boys at the school wear white shirts, khaki shorts, grey stockings with two blue stripes on either side of a red stripe; black or brown shoes; jungle green pullovers and a blue tie. Grey trousers are worn on Weekends, Wednesdays and school events such as Founders Day Celebrations. Junior prefects wear ties with red stripes rather than the conventional blue ones while their senior counterparts' ties are black with red stripes. Senior commoners wear navy blue ties.

Notable alumni

John Gachora - Managing Director of NIC Bank and former vice president, Bank of America
James Gichuru - founding member of the Kenya African National Union (KANU) party
Johnson Gicheru - former Chief Justice of Kenya
John Keen - activist for multiparty democracy in Kenya
Margaret Kenyatta - first woman mayor of Nairobi and first girl to enrol at Alliance High School
Maina Kiai - former Chairman of the Kenya National Human Rights Commission
Mugo Kibati - CEO, Telkom Kenya
Mbiyu Koinange - first Kenyan African to hold a degree, and Minister for Foreign Affairs
Bernard Mate - one of the first group of Africans to be elected to the Kenya Legislative Council
Eliud Mathu -  first African member of the Legislative Council
Kenneth Matiba - first African Permanent Secretary in Kenya and prominent opposition figure in the 1980s and 1990s
Njoroge Mungai - member of the first Kenyan cabinet; recipient of the Commander of the National Order of Merit of France
Kiraitu Murungi - former Minister for Energy and prominent politician
Makau W. Mutua - SUNY distinguished Professor of Law
David Mwiraria - former Finance Minister
James Mworia - Managing Director of Centum Investment Company
Duncan Ndegwa - first African and longest serving Governor of the Central Bank of Kenya
Ronald Ngala - first and only president of the first opposition party in Kenya the Kenya African Democratic Union (KADU)
Philip Ndegwa - former Central Bank Governor and entrepreneur
Paul Ngei - Kenyan freedom fighter, a member of the Kapenguria 6 and former cabinet minister
Charles Njonjo - first Attorney General of Kenya
Jeremiah J.M. Nyagah - Kenyan freedom fighter who later served in several key cabinet positions
Peter Anyang' Nyong'o - Kenyan politician and prominent multi-party activist in 1980s and 1990s Kenya
James Ole Kiyiapi - presidential election candidate, Kenyan presidential elections 2013
James Orengo - prominent politician, activist and lawyer
Ngũgĩ wa Thiong'o - author, novelist and playwright. Prominent figure in African literature
Amos Wako - second Attorney General of Kenya
David Wasawo - first East African to receive a degree in science; zoologist and educationist

References

Further reading

External links
Alliance High School website
Alliance High School alumni website

High schools and secondary schools in Kenya
Schools in Nairobi
1926 establishments in Kenya
Educational institutions established in 1926
Boys' schools in Kenya